Leonid Mina (born 28 March 2004) is an Albanian-born Greek professional footballer who plays as a forward for Super League club PAS Giannina.

References

2004 births
Living people
Greek people of Albanian descent
Greek footballers
Greek expatriate footballers
Greek expatriate sportspeople in Germany
Super League Greece players
Regionalliga players
PAS Giannina F.C. players
SV Werder Bremen II players
Association football forwards